Wadha bint Muhammad Al Orair (died 4 May 1969) was one of the spouses of Abdulaziz, the founder of the Kingdom of Saudi Arabia. She was from the Bani Khalid tribe which ruled the Eastern Arabia for a long time and was the most powerful tribe in this region during the late 18th century.

Wahda married Abdulaziz in Kuwait in 1896, and they had five children: Prince Turki, King Saud, Prince Khalid, Prince Abdullah and Princess Mounira. Of them Prince Khalid and Prince Abdullah died young. 

Wadha's sister, Hussa, first married the Kuwaiti ruler Mubarak Al Sabah and then, following her divorce from Mubarak, she married Abdulaziz. In her lifetime Wadha witnessed the death of her five children. She died in Riyadh on 4 May 1969, shortly after the death of King Saud in Athens.

References

Wahda
Wahda
1969 deaths
Wahda
Wahda
Year of birth missing
Princesses by marriage